Lowell House was an American social settlement, the first in New Haven, Connecticut. Established in 1900, it formed an association in 1903.

History
Established January, 1900, as an outgrowth of a flower mission operated by the youth of the Second Congregational Church, Fair Haven, and the personal incentive of Dr. Julia E. Teele, who established herself in a tenement occupied by five other families, "to study the needs, live a life of neighborliness, and to interest others in our neighbors."  In February, 1901, an advisory council was organized which assumed the financial burden of the work, and the house at 153 Franklin Street was taken. In March, 1903, an association was formed and a constitution adopted. The settlement was maintained by voluntary subscriptions.

The gift was the largest of its kind on record and would allow the settlement work to be conducted on a broader and more effective basis. Farnam was interested in the work of Lowell House, and was one of five Yale University professors who, together with several women of New Haven, composed the Council of the organization.

Neighborhood
The settlement was located at 202 Franklin Street (January 1900 to January 1901), 153 Franklin Street (1901 to 
May 15, 1907), and Dr. Teele's apartment, Hamilton Streel (1906-). From 1907, it was located at 198 Hamilton Street, with a dispensary at 206 Hamilton Street.

The settlement was located in a factory district. While there were a considerable number of Irish families left, they were fast being pushed out and the district was becoming characteristically Italian. There were some Jews, Russians and Germans.

Activities
Lowell House was involved in several activities, such as representation in the various city movements for better conditions. It was involved in an investigation of housing, as a result of which a committee was formed which drafted the Connecticut Tenement House Act, which passed in 1905. The movement which led to the presentation to the Connecticut legislature of a bill for the regulation of tenement houses had its origin in two independent organizations, one in Hartford, Connecticut, the other in New Haven. In New Haven, the Lowell House Association took up the matter in the winter of 1901-02, and by enlisting the volunteer work of students and others and securing the cooperation of the city authorities, made a thorough and careful investigation of nine city blocks in one of the worst quarters of the city.  This led to the formation of a volunteer committee which contained representatives of the business interests of New Haven as well as city officials, sanitary experts, and charitable workers, and this committee drafted a bill which was presented by Senator Eli Whitney of New Haven.

Residents were also able to be of service in organizing the District Nurses Association, the Consumers' League, and the Associated Civic Societies.

Lowell House maintained a noon lunch ciub for factory girls, a dispensary, a bank, and a branch of the public library. In the Lowell House library, all the readers were children, except for the few foreign language books read hy adults.

Piano lessons and practice were available, as well as classes in sewing, drawing, cooking, carving, kitchen gardening, painting, iron work, dressmaking, and basketry. There were various clubs for children and women, boys and young men; English classes for foreigners. Summer work included a playground open for eight weeks, piano lessons, a woman's club, dispensary, noon lunch, and some informal work.

The Lowell House had a wide influence in the promotion of good citizenship among the working classes.

In 1900, Delia Lyman Porter organized the Mothers' Club of Lowell House, and served as president for more than two decades. In 1926, representing the club and its opposition to the amending of the National Prohibition Act, Porter spoke before Congress:—

Residents 
As of 1911, there were four women residents and three men. There were also 40 women volunteers and ten men. Head Residents included: Dr. Julia E. Teele (January 1900 to Spring 1905), Ethel R. Evans (October 1905-).

See also
 Settlement and community houses in the United States

References

1900 establishments
Settlement houses in the United States
Buildings and structures in New Haven, Connecticut
Organizations based in New Haven, Connecticut
History of New Haven, Connecticut